Mitchell White or Mitch White may refer to:
Mitch White (baseball) (born 1994), American baseball player
Mitch White (footballer, born 1996), former Australian rules footballer
Mitchell White (footballer, born 1973), former Australian rules footballer
Mitchell White (gridiron football) (born 1990), American gridiron football player